Ambil is an island barangay in the Philippines that covers the island of the same name along with the two other smaller outlying islands of Mandaui and Malavatuan to the northeast. The barangay is administered as part of the municipality of Looc, Occidental Mindoro.

See also

 List of islands of the Philippines

References

Islands of Occidental Mindoro
Barangays of Occidental Mindoro